The Esplanade of the European Parliament, or simply the mall, with its most representative part Solidarność 1980 Esplanade, (or) is a pedestrian mall in Brussels (Belgium), completed in 2002.

Position
The mall runs the central length of the Espace Léopold (the European Parliament buildings in Brussels), with the Alterio Spinelli building to the east and the Willy Brandt and József Antall to the west joined to the former by the circular Konrad Adenauer footbridge running over the mall. The former station building (see below) has been converted into an information centre and fronts onto Luxembourg Square.

The mall itself covers a once over-ground railway station, the Brussels-Luxembourg Station (formerly known as the Leopold Quarter station). The paving over the top of the station allowed the construction of Parliament and created a direct link between Luxembourg Square to the west and Leopold Park to the east. The railway station's old entrance, since converted into part of the Parliamentary complex, is replaced by a glass covered stairway rising out of the mall's southern portion. The far south end is flanked by low-rise apartment blocks and is adjacent to local museums.

Criticism
It has been criticised for "leading nowhere" as, aside from the Parliament and railway station, the mall is devoid of life. Parliamentary authorities did not wish to share the site with private enterprise, primarily for security reasons, and hence there are no shops or services along its entire length. There are plans to extend it along the railway tracks to the north, meeting up with the Berlaymont on the Rue de la Loi and to the south, so the Commission's extra 'pole' of buildings in Auderghem however residential opposition and delays mean this is not likely and it was not included as an option in recent architectural competitions.

Design
The mall is largely light pink and white flagstone, with the southern segment broken by grassy areas running down its centre. It curves following the layout of the train station below and the Parliamentary buildings above built around the tracks. In the stone in the northern segment are engraved marble slabs in the ground commemorating the first meeting of the World Day to Overcome Extreme Poverty on 17 October 1987 in Paris. They are written in four languages and contains a quote from Joseph Wresinski and a commemoration of the 29 May 2002 follow up meeting in Brussels.

In the re-planning of the European Quarter, the "public stature" of the mall is to be reinforced, along with the east-west connections. The northern end, which cuts off suddenly at Rue Belliard, is to be improved, subject to an architecture competition. The southern segment will also be improved with better connections to residences, the park and the local museums. The government also seeks ideas on how to bring more life to the mall.

Name
According to Brussels' government, the term the mall, translated from the French le mail, was given by the designers due to the origin of the word mail. The etymology of mail refers to the game, mail (a form of croquet) which was played in 16th century France on a raised grassy valley adjoining the Tuileries Palace Gardens. The proximity of Leopold Park to the esplanade, which was originally higher, led the designers to apply the term.

The central and most representative part of the mall was named the "Solidarność 1980" esplanade and runs parallel to Rue de Trèves between Chaussée de Wavre and Rue Belliard. This alludes to the Solidarność trade union and social movement, which is a symbol of the fight against the Iron Curtain because it played a central role in bringing Poland's suppressive Communist regime to an end in the 1989.

Events
On 3 June 2010 the Belgian Presidency of the Council of the European Union arranged a dance event, show and concert on the Esplanade and Place du Luxembourg, inviting members of the public. Among the artists performing on the stage erected on the Agora of Solidarity for the event were Brian Molko, Stromae, Sandra Kim. The celebration, themed "I ♥ EU" (pronounced "I love you"), ended with a fireworks display and a "late-night after party hosted by a top DJ". Belgian television broadcast the event, which also was available through the Eurovision network and on the website of the Presidency.

See also
 Parlamentarium

References

European quarter of Brussels
Streets in Brussels